Ardeth Lake is a lake in Tuolumne County, California, in the United States.

Ardeth Lake was named for a Yosemite ranger's wife.

See also
List of lakes in California

References

Lakes of Tuolumne County, California
Lakes of Yosemite National Park